Roof pitch is the steepness of a roof expressed as a ratio of inch(es) rise per horizontal foot (or their metric equivalent), or as the angle in degrees its surface deviates from the horizontal.  A flat roof has a pitch of zero in either instance; all other roofs are pitched.

A roof that rises 3 inches per foot, for example, would be described as having a pitch of 3 (or “3 in 12”).

Description
The pitch of a roof is its vertical 'rise' over its horizontal 'run’ (i.e. its span), also known as its 'slope'.

In the imperial measurement systems, "pitch" is usually expressed with the rise first and run second (in the US, run is held to number 12; e.g., 3:12, 4:12, 5:12).  In metric systems either the angle in degrees or rise per unit of run, expressed as a '1 in _' slope (where a '1 in 1' equals 45°) is used.  Where convenient, the least common multiple is used (e.g., a '3 in 4' slope, for a '9 in 12' or '1 in 1 1/3').

Selection
Considerations involved in selecting a roof pitch include availability and cost of materials, aesthetics, ease or difficulty of construction, climatic factors such as wind and potential snow load, and local building codes.

The primary purpose of pitching a roof is to redirect wind and precipitation, whether in the form of rain or snow. Thus, pitch is typically greater in areas of high rain or snowfall, lower in areas of high wind. The steep roof of the tropical Papua New Guinea longhouse, for example, sweeps almost to the ground. The high, steeply-pitched gabled roofs of Northern Europe are typical in regions of heavy snowfall. In some areas building codes require a minimum slope.  Buffalo, New York and Montreal, Quebec, Canada, specify 6 in 12, a pitch of approximately 26.6 degrees.

A flat roof includes pitches as low as 1/2:12 to 2:12 (1 in 24 to 1 in 6), which are barely capable of properly shedding water. Such low-slope roofs (up to 4:12 (1 in 3)) require special materials and techniques to avoid leaks. Conventional describes pitches from 4:12 (1 in 3) to 9:12 (3 in 4). Steep is above 9:12 (3 in 4) (21:12) (7 in 4) and may require extra fasteners.

US convention is to use whole numbers when even (e.g. "three in twelve") or the nearest single or two-digit fraction when not (e.g. either "five and a half in twelve" or "five point five in twelve", each expressed numerically as 5-1/2:12 and 5.5:12) respectively.

Definitions vary on when a roof is considered pitched.  In degrees, 10°(2 in 12 or 1 in 6) is considered by at least one reference a minimum. 

In trigonomic expression, exact roof slope in degrees is given by the arctangent. For example: arctan(3/12)=14.0°

Framing carpenters cut rafters on an angle to "pitch" a roof.  Lower pitched roof styles allow for lower structures with a corresponding reduction in framing and sheathing materials.

Historic expressions of roof pitch

Historically, roof pitch was designated in two other ways: A ratio of the ridge height to the width of the building (span) and as a ratio of the rafter length to the width of the building.

Commonly used roof pitches were given names such as:
 Greek: the ridge height is 1/9 to 1/7th the span (an angle of 12.5° to 16°); 
 Roman: the ridge height is 2/9ths to 1/3 the span (an angle of 24° to 34°);
 Common: the rafter length is 3/4 the span (about 48°);
 Gothic: the rafters equal the span (60°); and 
 Elizabethan: the rafters are longer than the span (more than 60°).

See also 
List of roof shapes
Shed roof
Flat roof
Types of Pitched roof

References

External links
How to determine roof pitch  
Roof pitch calculator
Online roof pitch calculator
Aerial Roof Measurements

Building
Building engineering